Eierpunsch (literally "egg punch") is the German name given to a warm, sweetened alcoholic, egg-based drink similar to egg nog. It is commonly a winter drink and can be found served in the popular Christmas markets of Germany and Austria. Eierpunsch is made with egg yolks, sugar, white wine and vanilla. Sometimes cream or custard can be added.

See also

References
Eierpunsch

Mixed drinks
Christmas food
Christmas in Germany
German cuisine
Austrian cuisine
Sweet cocktails
Cocktails with wine
Cocktails with eggs
Creamy cocktails